The 2018–19 Bahraini King's Cup is the 17th season of the Bahraini King's Cup, the national football cup competition of Bahrain since it was renamed as the King's Cup in 2003 (named Emir Cup or Federation Cup before). The winners of the competition will earn a spot in the 2020 AFC Cup.

Preliminary round
In the preliminary round, nine teams were divided into two groups, one of five and one of four. The matches were played between 30 August and 25 September 2018.

Group 1

Group 2

Round of 16
The first legs were played between 21 and 22 October 2018, and the second legs were played between 25 and 27 October 2018.

|}

Quarter-finals
The first legs will be played between 4–5 December 2018, and the second legs will be played between 8–9 December 2018.

|}

Semi-finals
The first leg matches played on 6 February, while the second leg matches played on 11 February.

|}

Final

References

External links
Soccerway

Bahraini King's Cup seasons
King's Cup
Bahrain